On February 15, 2010, the Michigan Library Consortium (MLC) merged with INCOLSA to form the Midwest Collaborative for Library Services (MCLS).  MCLS is a non-profit membership organization composed of various types of libraries from Indiana and Michigan.  MCLS provides libraries a convenient, single point of contact for training, group purchasing and technical support for electronic resources.

For further information, see the Midwest Collaborative for Library Services (MCLS) website.

Library consortia in Michigan